Clinton Dewey Harden, Jr. (born April 12, 1947) is an American former politician. He was a Republican member of the New Mexico State Senate from 2002 to 2012. An alumnus of the United States Naval Academy and the University of Utah, he is a business administrator.

References

1947 births
Living people
People from Belen, New Mexico
University of Utah alumni
United States Military Academy alumni
Republican Party New Mexico state senators
People from Clovis, New Mexico